40 Carats is a 1973 American romantic comedy film directed by Milton Katselas. It is based on the 1968 play of the same name by Jay Presson Allen. The screenplay was written by Leonard Gershe (who significantly changed the ending).

The film stars Liv Ullmann, Edward Albert, Gene Kelly, Binnie Barnes, Deborah Raffin, Nancy Walker, and Natalie Schafer. Ullman was nominated for a Golden Globe as Best Motion Picture Actress, Musical or Comedy, and the Writers Guild of America nominated Gershe's screenplay for Best Comedy Adapted from Another Medium.

Plot
Ann Stanley, who sells real estate in New York City, is on vacation with her mother in Greece when her car breaks down. To her rescue comes a young man on a motorbike, Peter Latham, who has a difficult time persuading Ann to accept a ride. They become better acquainted, drink ouzo, and ultimately consummate the relationship. Ann enjoys his company, but still views their relationship as a summer fling.

Back home, at a party one night, Ann is stunned when her grown daughter turns up with Peter as her date. Peter was not her daughter's date - he picked her up at her home in place of her daughter's date. It turns out, however, that Peter's goal is to resume his romantic acquaintance with Ann, having developed feelings for her during the summer. The age difference embarrasses Ann greatly. He is 22, and she is 40. Friends and associates of Ann are somewhat aghast at her behavior as the persistent Peter refuses to take no for an answer. In time, after demonstrating a great deal of reluctance, Ann finally acknowledges that the only thing that matters is true love.

Cast
Liv Ullmann as Ann Stanley
Edward Albert as Peter Latham
Gene Kelly as Billy Boylan
Binnie Barnes as Maud Ericson
Deborah Raffin as Trina Stanley
Billy Green Bush as J.D. Rogers
Nancy Walker as Mrs. Margolin
Don Porter as Mr. Latham
Rosemary Murphy as Mrs. Latham
Natalie Schafer as Mrs. Adams
Claudia Jennings as Gabriella
Sam Chew Jr. as Arthur Forbes

Production
Audrey Hepburn, Elizabeth Taylor, Joanne Woodward, Doris Day, Glenda Jackson, Shirley MacLaine, and Sophia Loren were all considered for the role of Ann Stanley before the original director (William Wyler) bowed out of the production.

On the Broadway stage in 1968, the role was originated by Julie Harris, who won a Tony Award for her performance. Actresses June Allyson, Joan Fontaine, and Zsa Zsa Gabor succeeded her on Broadway in the play, which ran for 780 performances.

References

External links 
 

1973 films
1973 romantic comedy films
American romantic comedy films
Columbia Pictures films
Films scored by Michel Legrand
American films based on plays
Films set in Greece
Films set in New York City
Films shot in Athens
1970s English-language films
Films directed by Milton Katselas
1970s American films